Rush Limbaugh Is a Big Fat Idiot and Other Observations is a 1996 American book by Al Franken. It is satirically critical of 1990s right-wing political figures such as Pat Buchanan, Bob Dole, Phil Gramm, Newt Gingrich, and particularly radio host Rush Limbaugh. Franken often makes his points through humor, including the use of graphs with his handwriting superimposed over them.

The book ranked #1 on the New York Times Best Seller List, February 25, 1996.

Franken has said that he chose to make the book's title an ad hominem attack as "an ironic comment on the fact that Rush makes ad hominem attacks all the time". Franken cited, for example, Limbaugh's attack on Chelsea Clinton, whom Limbaugh had described as "the White House dog". Franken said his motivation for writing the book was the rise of Newt Gingrich, who used Limbaugh as "his mouthpiece".

The audiobook version won the 1997 Grammy Award for Best Spoken Comedy Album.

References 

1996 non-fiction books
Books critical of conservatism in the United States
Books by Al Franken
English-language books
Grammy Award for Best Comedy Album
Satirical books